Kindlmann is a German surname. Notable people with the surname include:

Dieter Kindlmann (born 1982), German tennis player
Gordon Kindlmann, American computer scientist
Norbert Kindlmann (born 1944), German rower

German-language surnames